Cranmore is a village on the Isle of Wight. It is located about three miles east of Yarmouth, in the northwest of the island. It is in the civil parish of shalfleet

Transport is provided by Southern Vectis bus route 7, serving Freshwater, Yarmouth and Newport including intermediate towns.

Three areas of grassland, scrub and woodland situated around the village are designated as a Site of Special Scientific Interest. Together the three areas cover 12.4 hectares (30.7 acres) and were notified in 2002. The sites are home to the dormouse (Muscardinus avellanarius), red squirrel (Sciurus vulgaris) and the nationally scarce small pearl-bordered fritillary (Boloria selene) and Kent black arches (Meganola albula). Other species include the adder (Vipera berus) and the common lizard (Lacerta vivipara), and nightingale (Luscinia megarhynchos).

References

Villages on the Isle of Wight
Sites of Special Scientific Interest on the Isle of Wight